Ernest Bubb (6 December 1884 – 26 November 1946) was an Australian cricketer. He played five first-class matches for New South Wales between 1905/06 and 1908/09.

See also
 List of New South Wales representative cricketers

References

External links
 

1884 births
1946 deaths
Australian cricketers
New South Wales cricketers
Cricketers from Sydney
Australian Army personnel of World War II
Australian Army officers